Vicente Filísola (born Vincenzo Filizzola;  1785 – 23 July 1850) was an Italian-born Spanish and Mexican military and political figure during the 19th century. He is most well known for his role in leading the short-lived Mexican annexation of Central America between 1822 and 1823.

Life and career
Very little written information exists on Vicente Filísola's early life other than he was born Vincenzo Filizzola in Rivello, Kingdom of Naples in around 1785 and later moved to Spain when he was a child. He joined the Spanish army on 17 March 1804 at age 15, fighting in many battles of the Napoleonic Wars. He later served in New Spain in 1811. As a supporter of Agustín de Iturbide, who declared himself emperor of Mexico, he became a brigadier general in command of the Army of the Three Guarantees. Emperor Iturbide sent him to Central America to ensure its inclusion in the Mexican Empire. This he did, but when Iturbide fell in 1823 and Mexico was declared a republic, Central America (except for Chiapas) declared independence from Mexico.

As a governor of Mexico, he occupied Guatemala City after the formation of the Federal Republic of Central America and was successful in annexing El Salvador in 1823, causing an uprising there. In compliance with the Mexican constitution, Filísola convened the Central American congress which forthwith declared its independence from Mexico. Filísola was not able to maintain a fighting force, and his troops were sent back to Mexico by the residents of Guatemala City who paid for their transportation.

Filísola received a colonization grant in October, 1831, to bring six hundred non-Anglo-American families into east Texas. In 1833, he became commander of the Eastern Internal Provinces.

In early 1836, Antonio López de Santa Anna commissioned Filísola as his second-in-command during his fight for Texas. Filísola never had to command any decisive battles in the Texas Revolution, but was left trailing Santa Anna as the Mexican leader sped forward. At the Guadalupe River, Filísola was left in charge of the troops moving the heavy military equipment, supply wagons, and livestock across Texas. Moving the bulk of the army over rain-soaked land and numerous flooded crossings, proved to be logistically fatal. While Santa Anna quickly proceeded toward Sesma and the Colorado River, Filísola with the rear guard, was mired down in mud, low on food, short on supplies, and exhausted. He was left to delegate the orders issued by Santa Anna.

Filísola's dispatches to Santa Anna were captured by Sam Houston's men and this led directly to the battle. While Santa Anna was preoccupied with the attempt to the capture the new republic's officials, Filísola was instructed to wait for Colonel Amat's, General Gaona's, and Sesma forces to converge. Then, locate a crossing, establish a camp and take 500 men, cross, find, attack, and defeat the Texians and then cross the Brazos with the remainder of the army and supplies and proceed to form a camp at Harrisburg.

Vicente Filísola was somewhere between San Felipe and Fort Bend, with about 1,000 men, (after dispatching General Cos with 500 men to reinforce Santa Anna), when Santa Anna was captured by the Texans at the Battle of San Jacinto on 21 April 1836.

The next day, Captain Miguel Aguirre, a wounded officer from Santa Anna's guard, of the Tampico Regiment, made his way to Filísola's camp on the Brazos, with word of the total destruction of the Mexican army at San Jacinto. A few more locals and soldiers trickled in and also confirmed and much exaggerated their defeat. At the time, Filísola did not have any knowledge if Santa Anna was still alive, thus he was unsure if he should rush to aid him. The news of Santa Anna's defeat had badly demoralized Filísola's troops, and any action he would take against Houston might possibly risk the demise of all Mexican prisoners. His other option was to retreat, requesting instruction from officials in Mexico City.

The Mexican troops in Texas, which included Filísola's 1,000 troops and General José de Urrea's 1,500 troops, linked up at Elizabeth Powell's Boardinghouse near Fort Bend, where the generals held a council of war headed by Filísola. A captured Mexican soldier, pressed in the role of a courier by the Texans, was sent to the Mexican camp with a message from the captive Santa Anna ordering Filísola to withdraw all Mexican troops east of the Colorado River and Texas itself in exchange for the Texans agreeing to spare Santa Anna's life. Agreeing to depart, Filísola was responsible for organizing the withdrawal of the remaining 4,000 Mexican soldiers from Texas.

Filísola remarkably carried out Santa Anna's orders to retreat despite protests from Urrea and a few other officers to stay and continue fighting the Texans. On 24 May, he ordered Juan José Andrade to destroy the fortifications of the Alamo and to evacuate his 1,200 troops from San Antonio and "ratified", according to the Republic of Texas, the Treaties of Velasco. Filísola and Andrade then combined their forces at Goliad and continued the retreat toward Matamoros.

After both parties to the treaties broke parts of the agreement, Filísola received instructions from the Mexican government to not retreat. Although he offered to return to Texas, the exhausted Mexican army continued to withdraw and arrived at Matamoros where on 15 June, Urrea replaced Filísola in general command and Filísola resigned his own command to Juan José Andrade.

During the Mexican–American War Filísola commanded one of three divisions of the Mexican army.

Vicente Filísola died of cholera in Mexico City on 23 July 1850 at around age 65.

Legacy

Although Filísola was accused of being a coward and a traitor in Mexico for overseeing the withdrawal of the Mexican troops despite that his own forces were never defeated in battle, he was exonerated in 1841. However forgetting his own role in the defeat at San Jacinto, Santa Anna placed the entire blame on Filísola.

Filísola was quoted as saying about Santa Anna "His forehead had clouded over... Some interpreted it as discouragement, others as despair, and not a few as rudeness, scorn or indifference towards all the persons that he had to deal with or met with for some reason or other." Filísola often had the job of dealing with Santa Anna's snap judgements.

He later published a defense of his retreat which was later translated and published in 1837 by the Republic of Texas. 
In 1928 Castañeda published a translation of Filísola's account in The Mexican Side of the Texas Revolution, and his complete account of the Texas Revolution is found in Memoirs for the History of the War in Texas, published in 1985.

He had several descendants around Mexico, especially in the north. He married and had a family in Mexico City and male descendants.

Decorations 

  Knight of the Imperial Order of Guadalupe (December 1821)

Footnotes

References
Memoirs for the History of the War in Texas. Vicente Filísola, 1985 Eakin Press, Austin, Texas
The Mexican Side of the Texas Revolution, 1836. Carlos E. Castaneda, trans. P. L .Turner 1956 (reprint of 1928 ed.)

External links

1780s births
1850 deaths
People from the Province of Salerno
Deaths from cholera
Italian soldiers
Mexican generals
Mexican military personnel of the Mexican–American War
Mexican people of Italian descent
People of Mexican side in the Texas Revolution
Infectious disease deaths in Mexico
Heads of state of the Federal Republic of Central America
People of the Kingdom of Naples